Jack Austin (3 February 1900 – 23 March 1988) was a British weightlifter. He competed in the men's middleweight event at the 1924 Summer Olympics.

References

External links
 

1900 births
1988 deaths
British male weightlifters
Olympic weightlifters of Great Britain
Weightlifters at the 1924 Summer Olympics
Place of birth missing
20th-century British people